Shellard is a surname. Notable people with the surname include:

Dominic Shellard (born 1966), British academic and politician
Edwin Hugh Shellard (1815/16–1885), British architect 
Rhys Shellard (born 1985), British rugby union player

Surnames of British Isles origin